Elvis Kokalović (born 17 July 1988) is a Croatian football defender who currently plays for NK Novigrad.

Club career
In February 2018, Kokalović joined NK Novigrad.

Club statistics

1 Including Polish SuperCup.

References

External links

 

1988 births
Living people
Sportspeople from Novo Mesto
Association football defenders
Croatian footballers
Croatia youth international footballers
Croatia under-21 international footballers
NK Slaven Belupo players
NK Koprivnica players
Konyaspor footballers
Kardemir Karabükspor footballers
Lech Poznań players
NK Novigrad players
Croatian Football League players
Süper Lig players
TFF First League players
Ekstraklasa players
Croatian expatriate footballers
Expatriate footballers in Turkey
Croatian expatriate sportspeople in Turkey
Expatriate footballers in Poland
Croatian expatriate sportspeople in Poland